The Goat is a 1918 American silent comedy film directed by Donald Crisp and written by Frances Marion. The film stars Fred Stone, Fanny Midgley, Charles McHugh, Rhea Mitchell, Sylvia Ashton, Philo McCullough, and Winifred Greenwood. The film was released on September 29, 1918, by Paramount Pictures.

Plot
As described in a film magazine, ironworker Chuck McCarthy (Stone) loves Molly O'Connors (Greenwood), a stenographer for the Filmcraft Studio. While working near an open stage of the studio, Chuck decides to become a motion picture star. He rescues a pet monkey belonging to Bijou Lamour (Rhea Mitchell), the leading lady of the company, and is signed to "double" for her in a skating scene. He forgets himself and in another scene whips a half dozen "Germans" in a war film. Finally, he is cast to double for Marmaduke X. Caruthers (McCullough), who refuses to ride a horse in a western film. Chuck falls off the horse and is badly injured. Caruthers is lionized for his bravery while Chuck is nursed back to health by Molly, and he decides to give up his screen career. He receives a check for $1,000 from the studio and uses it to pay off Molly's mortgage.

Cast
Fred Stone as Chuck McCarthy
Fanny Midgley as Mrs. McCarthy
Charles McHugh as Mr. McCarthy
Rhea Mitchell as Bijou Lamour
Sylvia Ashton as The Baby Vampire
Philo McCullough as Marmaduke X. Caruthers
Winifred Greenwood as Molly O'Connors
Charles Stanton Ogle as Director Graham
Ernest Joy as Studio Manager
Clarence Geldart as Casting Director

References

External links 
 

1918 films
1910s English-language films
Silent American comedy films
1918 comedy films
Paramount Pictures films
Films directed by Donald Crisp
American black-and-white films
American silent feature films
1910s American films